Estonia attempted to enter the Eurovision Song Contest 1993, the first time the country tried to enter the Eurovision Song Contest. However, as Estonia was one of seven countries who wished to join the Eurovision Song Contest for the first time in 1993, a pre-selection was held for the first time to reduce this number to three countries who would compete in the final of the Contest in May, held in Millstreet, Ireland.

Background 

On 15 January 1993, the Estonian national broadcaster, ETV, confirmed their intentions to debut at the 1993 Eurovision Song Contest. The Estonian national broadcaster ETV broadcasts the event within Estonia and organises the selection process for the nation's entry. Along with their participation confirmation, the broadcaster announced the name of nation's representative at the contest and revealed that the song for the contest would be selected through a national final.

Before Eurovision

Artist selection
On 15 January 1993, ETV announced that they had internally selected Janika Sillamaa to represent Estonia at the Eurovision Song Contest 1993. Along with the announcement of the selected artist, ETV announced that a national final would be held to select the song for the contest.

Eurolaul 1993
ETV opened a public song submission from 15 January until 5 February 1993. A national final, Eurolaul, was held on 20 February 1993 at the ETV studios in Tallinn, hosted by Mart Sander, to select the song that she would sing at the contest.

The winning song, selected by an expert jury, was "Muretut meelt ja südametuld", which went on to compete for one of the three places in the Eurovision Song Contest 1993.

At Kvalifikacija za Millstreet 
With the dissolution of the Soviet Union and the disintegration of Yugoslavia many newly independent countries were formed who became interested in competing in the Eurovision Song Contest. With this large influx of countries the European Broadcasting Union were forced to create a new measure to counter overcrowding in the contest. For the 1993 Contest the EBU decided to hold a one-off contest to select three countries to join the 22 countries already competing in the Eurovision Song Contest.

The Kvalifikacija za Millstreet (Qualification for Millstreet) contest was held in Ljubljana, Slovenia on 3 April at the TV studios of Slovene broadcaster Radiotelevizija Slovenija (RTV SLO). Seven countries in total competed, including Estonia, for a place in the final on 15 May 1993. Sillamaa performed third, following Croatia and preceding Hungary. She received 47 points, placing 5th in the line-up, and failing to qualify to the grand final in Ireland.

Voting

References

External links
Estonian National Final 1993

1993
Countries in the Eurovision Song Contest 1993
Eurovision